Mobile service is – in line to ITU Radio Regulations – a radiocommunication service between mobile and land stations, or between mobile stations (CV).

Classification

In accordance with ITU Radio Regulations (article 1) variations of this radiocommunication service are classified as follows:
Mobile service
Mobile-satellite service (article 1.25)
Land mobile service (article 1.26)
Land mobile-satellite service (article 1.27)
Maritime mobile service (article 1.28)
Maritime mobile-satellite service (article 1.29)
Port operations service (article 1.30)
Ship movement service (article 1.31)
Aeronautical mobile service (article 1.32)
Aeronautical mobile (R)° service (article 1.33)
Aeronautical mobile (OR)°° service (article 1.33)
Aeronautical mobile-satellite service (article 1.35)
Aeronautical mobile-satellite (R)° service (article 1.36)
Aeronautical mobile-satellite (OR)°° service (article 1.37)
(R)° = abbreviation to route flights (route)(OR)°° = abbreviation to flights others than on routes (off-route)

Frequency allocation
The allocation of radio frequencies is provided according to Article 5 of the ITU Radio Regulations (edition 2012).

In order to improve harmonisation in spectrum utilisation, the majority of service-allocations stipulated in this document were incorporated in national Tables of Frequency Allocations and Utilisations which is with-in the responsibility of the appropriate national administration. The allocation might be primary, secondary, exclusive, and shared.
primary allocation:  is indicated by writing in capital letters
secondary allocation: is indicated by small letters (see example below)
exclusive or shared utilization: is within the responsibility of administrations 
However, military usage, in bands where there is civil usage, will be in accordance with the ITU Radio Regulations. In NATO countries military mobile utilizations will be in accordance with NATO Joint Civil/Military Frequency Agreement (NJFA).

 Example of frequency allocation

See also 
 Radio station
 Radiocommunication service

References

External links 
 Internationale Fernmeldeunion

Mobile services ITU